Alexander Barr (born January 21, 1968) is an American musician. He has been the lead singer of the Dropkick Murphys since 1998. He was also a founder and lead singer for The Bruisers, which he helped form in 1988 in Portsmouth, New Hampshire.  His first band circa 1984, was called D.V.A. (Direct Vole Assault). He also went on to front 5 Balls of Power, with future members of Scissorfight, The Radicts, L.E.S. Stitches, and US Bombs, before he formed The Bruisers. His band the Bruisers had played many shows with Boston's Dropkick Murphys, and when Dropkick lead singer Mike McColgan quit the band in 1998 the Murphys asked Barr to be the new lead singer. The first album the Dropkick Murphys released with Barr as singer was 1999's The Gang's All Here.

Personal life
Barr is of paternal Scottish descent and maternal German descent. He makes German-language remarks to audiences in German-speaking countries.

In December 2003, Barr and his wife Jessica had their first child, Strummer Barr, who was named after Joe Strummer of The Clash. 
They had their second child, a daughter, December 7th 2008, and their third child and second son on October 10th, 2012.

In February 2022 it was announced that Barr was forced to drop off of the Dropkick Murphys' 2022 St. Patrick’s Day Tour and their 2022 summer tour in Europe to take care of his ailing mother, who is battling Lewy Body Dementia. Jesse Ahern, Mikey Rivkees of The Rumjacks, and Jen Razavi of The Bombpops will be assisting on vocals for certain songs in place of Barr, with Ken Casey taking over other vocal duties for Barr.

References

Sources

Further reading 
 Herwick, Edgar B., III, "Interview with Al Barr", Front Row Boston, transcript, WGBH, aired July 5, 2014.

External links 

 

Singers from New Hampshire
American punk rock singers
American male singers
Living people
American people of Scottish descent
American people of German descent
1968 births
People from Hanover, New Hampshire
Dropkick Murphys members